Charles Redfearn Freeman (22 August 1887 – 17 March 1956) was an English professional footballer who played in the Football League for Chelsea, Gillingham and Burton United as an inside forward. After his retirement, he served Chelsea as trainer and groundsman. Freeman was also a cricketer and played one first-class cricket match for Derbyshire in July 1911.

Personal life 
Freeman served as a corporal in the Royal Air Force during the First World War and worked at the Royal Aircraft Factory.

Career statistics

Honours 
Chelsea

 Football League Second Division second-place promotion: 1911–12

References

External links

1887 births
1956 deaths
People from Overseal
Footballers from Derbyshire
English footballers
Association football inside forwards
Overseal Swifts F.C. players
Burton United F.C. players
Fulham F.C. players
Gillingham F.C. players
Chelsea F.C. players
Maidstone United F.C. (1897) players
English Football League players
Chelsea F.C. non-playing staff
English cricketers
Derbyshire cricketers
Royal Air Force personnel of World War I
Brentford F.C. wartime guest players